Matthew Gaines (August 4, 1840 – June 11, 1900) was a former slave, community leader, minister, and Republican Texas State Senator. He made valuable contributions towards the establishment of free public education in the state of Texas.

Early life
Matthew Gaines was born on August 4, 1840, near Alexandria, Louisiana to a female slave owned by the Martin Despallier family. Gaines taught himself to read from a white boy who smuggled in books. This boy may have been young Blaz Philipe Despallier, who lived on the estate and who would later become the sole heir of Alamo hero Charles Despallier, his uncle. After being sold from the Despallier family, Gaines escaped from his new owner in Louisiana to Arkansas, and eventually made it to New Orleans, where he was captured and returned to his master. In 1859, Gaines was sold to Christopher Columbus Hearne, where he remained until 1863 when he tried to flee to Mexico. He was caught again and was forced to work as a runaway slave in Fredericksburg, Texas until the end of the civil war.

Career
After the 1863 emancipation was finally officially announced in Texas on June 19, 1865, Gaines settled in Burton, Washington County, where he established himself as a leader of the freedmen, both as a Baptist preacher and a politician.

In 1869, Gaines was elected as a Senator of Texas's 16th district in the Twelfth Texas Legislature. He gained a reputation for being a guardian of the newly won rights of the African-Texans. Throughout his term, he addressed the issues of public education, prison reform, the protection of black voters, and tenant farming reformation. Gaines actively supported the forward movement that established the first public school system for all Texans and assisted in allowing Texas to take advantage of the federal Grant College Act, also known as the Morrill Act.

In 1870, Gaines played a strategic role in passing the Militia Bill, which created a state police force to combat lawlessness and to protect against voter intimidation. Gaines was elected to a six-year term to the Senate, but only served four years. In a politically motivated trial he was convicted of bigamy in 1873. Despite the charge being overturned on appeal, his seat was challenged by Seth Shepard and he was removed from office on the grounds of being a convicted felon. In 1875, he was arrested for making a civil rights speech in Giddings. He told his audience that "in the eyes of God, blacks are as good as whites; they should have pride and hold their heads up even in troubled times." Gaines continued to be active in politics and made his political views known in conventions, public gatherings, and from his pulpit.

Death and legacy

Gaines died in Giddings, Texas, on June 11, 1900.

In 1998, activists on the campus of Texas A&M University suggested Gaines should have his statue displayed prominently. The project was abandoned in the wake of the Aggie Bonfire tragedy in 1999. However, 19 years later, Texas A&M students and other supporters pushed yet again for the establishment of a statue of Matthew Gaines on the Texas A&M College Station campus. On June 19 of 2020, the donation goal of the “Matthew Gaines Initiative” was surpassed. A statue of Gaines was unveiled and dedicated on November 19, 2021.

In 2016, Lori Bartley, who claimed to be his great-granddaughter, ran unsuccessfully for US Congress against Sheila Jackson Lee.

See also
African-American officeholders during and following the Reconstruction era

References

External links
Sen. Matthew Gaines on the Immigration Bill
The Matthew Gaines Memorial Homepage
The 1870s: Matthew Gines – Texas State Library
Matthew Gaines at the Handbook of Texas Online

Politicians from Alexandria, Louisiana
Republican Party Texas state senators
19th-century American slaves
1840 births
1900 deaths
People from Washington County, Texas
People from Giddings, Texas
19th-century American politicians
African-American politicians during the Reconstruction Era
African-American state legislators in Texas